The 22221 / 22222 Mumbai Chhatrapati Shivaji Maharaj Terminus–Hazrat Nizamuddin Rajdhani Express also called Central Railway (CR) Rajdhani Express is a daily train of Rajdhani class operated by Central Railway between Chhatrapati Shivaji Maharaj Terminus and . Train no. 22221 leaves Chhatrapati Shivaji Maharaj Terminus at 16:00 daily and arrives Hazrat Nizamuddin at 09:55 everyday. The return train 22222 leaves Hazrat Nizamuddin at 16:55 daily and arrives Chhatrapati Shivaji Maharaj Terminus at 11:15 daily. CR Rajdhani Express runs with an average speed of 86 km/hr.

On 19 January 2021, Central Railways increased Rajdhani's frequency from 4 days a week to daily basis.

Coach composition 
CR Rajdhani Express runs with rolling stock:
 11 AC 3 – Tier (3A)
 5 AC 2 – Tier (2A)
 1 AC 1st Class (1A)
 1 Pantry car (PC)
 2 Luggage Rake & Generator car (EOG)

Traction
It is hauled by Kalyan-based WAP-7 (HOG)-equipped locomotive and run with push–pull method.

Route & halts
Chhatrapati Shivaji Maharaj Terminus

Bhopal Junction
Jhansi Junction

Agra Cantt

Notes 
CR Rajdhani Express will also add other full connectivity between Mumbai and Delhi after Punjab Mail which used to take almost 25 hours to reach Delhi from Mumbai.
This Rajdhani Express also uses the push–pull technique of locomotives as the train passes from the Kasara Ghat of Maharashtra.

References

External links
 22221 Rajdhani India Rail Info
 22222 Rajdhani India Rail Info

External links

Rajdhani Express trains
Express trains in India
Delhi–Mumbai trains
Rail transport in Maharashtra
Rail transport in Madhya Pradesh
Rail transport in Rajasthan
Rail transport in Uttar Pradesh
Rail transport in Haryana
Rail transport in Delhi